This Is What I Live For is the tenth studio album by Blue October, released via Up/Down-Brando Records on October 23, 2020 after originally being scheduled for September 18, 2020. The artwork for the album was created by Phillip Nichols. This Is What I Live For is the first Blue October studio album to feature lead guitarist Will Knaak on every song. The album also marks the first appearance of Justin Furstenfeld's daughter Blue Reed on one of the band's recordings, providing vocals on the song "Fight for Love". The title track features vocals and lyrics by Steve Schiltz of Longwave, a longtime collaborator and defacto session member of Blue October. The songs “I Will Follow You” and “This is What I Live For” were recorded at Peter Gabriel's Real World Studios.

Promotion
The first single, "Oh My My", reached the top 10 on the alternative rock radio chart in September 2020. The group also released a music video for "Oh My My". However, because of the COVID-19 pandemic, the band members did not appear in the video; instead it was created by animator Johnny Chew.

Track listing

Personnel
 Justin Furstenfeld – lead vocals, guitar, producer
 Jeremy Furstenfeld – drums
 Matt Noveskey – bass guitar
 Will Knaak – guitar
 Ryan Delahoussaye – keyboard, violin
 Eric Holtz – engineer
 Jayson Peters - Assistant Audio Engineer
 Kaleb Munoz  - Assistant Audio Engineer
 Steve Schiltz – vocals, guitar
 Karen Hover – vocals
 Blue Reed Furstenfeld – vocals
 Charley Siess - drum tech
 Phillip Nichols – sleeve art

Charts

References

2020 albums
Blue October albums